The Counterfeiters is a 1925 novel by French author , first published in . With many characters and crisscrossing plotlines, its main theme is that of the original and the copy, and what differentiates them – both in the external plot of the counterfeit gold coins and in the portrayal of the characters' feelings and their relationships. 
Other stylistic devices are also used, such as an omniscient narrator who sometimes addresses the reader directly, weighs in on the characters' motivations or discusses alternate realities. The structure of the novel was written to mirror "Cubism", in that it interweaves between several different plots and portrays multiple points of view.

An important part of the plot is its depiction of various possibilities of positive and negative homoerotic or homosexual relationships.

Initially received coldly on its appearance, perhaps because of its homosexual themes and its unusual composition, The Counterfeiters has gained reputation in the intervening years and is now generally counted among the Western canon of literature.

Plot summary

The plot revolves around  – a schoolfriend of 's who is preparing for his  – discovering he is a bastard and taking this as a welcome pretext for running away from home. He spends a night in 's bed (where  describes a recent visit to a prostitute and how he did not find the experience very enjoyable).

In some regards, such as the way in which the adolescents act and speak in a way beyond their years and the incompetence of the adults (especially the fathers), as well as its motives of developing and confused adolescent sexuality, the novel has common ground with Frank Wedekind's (at the time scandalous) 1891 drama Spring Awakening. The Counterfeiters also shares with that play the vision of homosexual relationships as under certain conditions being "better" than heterosexual ones, with the latter ones leading inevitably to destructive outcomes in both works.

The characters and their relationships
As the novel unfolds, many different characters and plotlines intertwine. This social network graph shows how the most important characters in The Counterfeiters are related to each other:

Relationship to The Thibaults
Some of the situations in the novel closely parallel those of the major novel of 's good friend, The Thibaults, which was published in installments beginning in 1922. Both novels center around two adolescent boys who have an intense (although apparently non-erotic) relationship and artistic or literary aspirations; both begin with one boy or both boys running away from home; both delve into the lives of the boys' siblings, including an older brother who is, at the beginning of the narrative, in training to be a physician; in both novels one of the boys becomes the protégé of an older man regarded as being of questionable character and edits a magazine under his direction; and in both novels there is a banquet scene in a public restaurant that corresponds to a falling out between the boy and his mentor. In manner there is little resemblance between the two novels, and in the later parts of 's sequence (not completed until 1940) the correspondences are less notable. The two authors read each other parts of their respective manuscripts prior to publication, and remained on good terms thereafter, so it appears that neither felt wronged in any way by the similarities. Gide acknowledged the influence of 's novel in a letter to the author dated July 8, 1925.

Possible identification of characters with real-life persons

 is also present in the party scene under his real name and his  is mentioned, meaning that the plot must be set between 1896 (the premiere of ) and 1907 ('s death). 's journal entry in chapter 12 of the third part, which makes mention of a 1904 vintage wine, seems to confirm this supposition with a more specific range of time in which the novel is likely to be set.

The setting must take place at least after 1898, the year in which the shipwreck of  occurred.

2010 film adaptation

Further reading
André Gide: The Counterfeiters. 
André Gide: Journal of The Counterfeiters.

See also

Le Monde 100 Books of the Century

References

External links
 
"Gide's Rhetoric of Acceptance in Les Faux-monnayeurs" by Eric Mader
"Gide's Fictional Technique" by Justin O'Brien

 
Second page: Archived from the original on October 13, 2020. Retrieved October 13, 2020.

1925 French novels
Novels by André Gide
French LGBT novels
Metafictional novels
Novels with gay themes
1920s LGBT novels
Works about money forgery
Éditions Gallimard books
French novels adapted into films
Modernist novels
Novels set in Paris